Couder is a small lunar impact crater that is located just behind the western limb of the Moon, in a region of the surface that is brought into view during favorable librations. It lies on the inner foothills of the Montes Cordillera, a ring-shaped mountain range that surrounds the Mare Orientale impact basin.

This region is relatively devoid of major craters, with the nearest being Schlüter almost due east. Slightly farther to the south of Couder is Maunder, at the edge of the mare. Couder was designated Maunder Z prior to being named by the IAU.

This is a bowl-shaped crater with a sharp rim and an interior floor about half the diameter of the crater. The crater is slightly long along a line to the northwest, where the inner wall is also at its widest. It is otherwise an undistinguished crater formation.

References

 
 
 
 
 
 
 
 
 
 
 
 

Impact craters on the Moon